Ainslie is a surname and given name, as well as a variant of Ainsley. People with the name include:

Notable people

Surname 
 Ben Ainslie (born 1977), English competitive sailor
 Brodie Ainslie (1891–1944), Australian rules footballer
 Charles Nicholas Ainslie (1856–1939), American entomologist
Charlotte Ainslie (1863-1960), Scottish educationalist and headmistress
 Douglas Ainslie (1865–1948), Scottish poet, translator, critic and diploma
 George Ainslie (disambiguation), multiple people, including:
 George Robert Ainslie (1776–1839), Scottish general and coin collector
 George Ainslie (general) (died 1804), Scottish general
 George Ainslie (delegate) (1838–1913), Congressional delegate from Idaho
 George Ainslie (psychologist) American psychiatrist, psychologist and behavioral economist
 George Ainslie (Virginia politician) (1868–1931), mayor of Richmond, Virginia
 Gilbert Ainslie (1793–1870), English academic and clergyman
 Henry Ainslie (1760–1834), English physician
 Hew Ainslie (1792–1878), Scottish poet
 Ian Ainslie (born 1967), South African Olympic sailor
 Jack Ainslie (1921–2007), English politician
 James Ainslie (disambiguation), multiple people, including:
 James Ainslie (cricketer) (1880–1953), Australian cricketer
 James Ainslie (pastoralist) (1787–1844), Scottish pastoralist, after whom some areas near Canberra are named
 John Ainslie (1745–1828), Scottish surveyor and cartographer
 Lee Ainslie, American hedge fund manager
 Montague Ainslie (1792–1884), English businessman
 Montague Ainslie (cricketer) (1823–1896), English cricketer
 Paul Ainslie (born 1967), city councillor in Toronto, Canada
 Robert Ainslie (disambiguation), multiple people, including:
 Robert Ainslie (rugby union) (fl. 1879–1882), Scottish rugby union football player
 Sir Robert Ainslie, 1st Baronet (1730–1812), Scottish ambassador, orientalist and numismatist
 Robert Ainslie (writer) (1766–1838), Scottish writer and correspondent of Robert Burns
 Thomas Ainslie (fl. 1881–1885), Scottish rugby football player
 William George Ainslie (1832–1893), English politician
 Sir Whitelaw Ainslie (1767–1837), British surgeon and writer

Given name 
 Ainslie Caterer (1858–1924), Australian cricketer, cricket administrator and educator
 Ainslie Embree (born 1921), American Indologist and historian
 Ainslie Henderson (born 1979), Scottish singer-songwriter
 Ainslie Kemp (born 1997), Australian rules footballer
 Ainslie Meares (1910–1986), Australian psychiatrist
 Ainslie Roberts (1911–1993), Australian painter, photographer, and commercial artist
 Ainslie Sheil (born 1933), Australian rugby union player

See also 
 Ainslee (disambiguation)
 Ainslie baronets

References 

Feminine given names
English unisex given names
English-language surnames
Scottish surnames